Allan Eastwood is an Irish cricketer. He made his international debut against The Netherlands on 11 August 2010 taking 4 wickets in the second innings.

Background 
Eastwood is from Roscrea in County Tipperary and began his cricketing career at Ballyeighan C.C. In his teens and early twenties he was a key member of the Ballyeighan side that won a Middle A Cup, Middle B Cup and numerous Midland and South East Cups. When Ballyeighan failed to gain promotion to senior ranks due to their lack of facilities Eastwood moved to Pembroke C.C. in Dublin.

International career 
After quickly establishing himself in Pembroke's first team Eastwood assumed the captaincy for the 2010 season. Impressing the Irish selectors with his action, pace and athleticism he was selected for the Ireland A side to play against the MCC at College Park, Trinity College, Dublin, on 3 August 2010.  In that match he did enough to impress the watching Ireland coach Phil Simmons and was called into the first team for the game against The Netherlands the following week. In addition to his four wickets in the second innings, Eastwood opened his first class account taking the wicket of Eric Szwarczynski in the first innings. He is the second man from Roscrea to play for Ireland, the other being Harry Read over a century ago.

Bowling style
Possessing a good action, Eastwood troubles batsmen with his pace, variation of seam movement, and the bounce he extracts from his 6 ft 5' frame.

Eastwood also tries to intimidate his opponents with trash-talk. Although the effectiveness of it is unclear because he's not great at it.

TGCTours design

Eastwood finished 4th in his World Cup group in 2022, losing to the trio of b101, Heisenberg and mvpmanatee.

References

External links
 Player Profile: Allan Eastwood  from Cricinfo
 Player Profile: Allan Eastwood from CricketWorld
 Match Report: Ireland v The Netherlands, Second Innings from Cricket Ireland
 Match Report: Ireland v The Netherlands, First Innings from Cricket Ireland

Irish cricketers
1979 births
Living people
Sportspeople from County Laois